Patrick Lachaud (born 8 March 1954) is a French bobsledder. He competed in the two man and the four man events at the 1984 Winter Olympics.

References

1954 births
Living people
French male bobsledders
Olympic bobsledders of France
Bobsledders at the 1984 Winter Olympics
People from Périgueux
Sportspeople from Dordogne